Hollingsworth is an unincorporated community in Banks County, Georgia, United States.

Notes

Unincorporated communities in Georgia (U.S. state)
Unincorporated communities in Banks County, Georgia